Nos 18 ans is a French comedy teen film directed by Frédéric Berthe and released in 2008. It is a remake of the 2006 Italian film Notte prima degli esami ("Night Before the Exams") written and directed by Fausto Brizzi. Alternative titles for the film include School's Out.

Plot
The depicts the lives of two groups of French teenagers in 1989 during their preparation for Baccalauréat, and features a number of homages to the 1980s.

Soundtrack 
The soundtrack includes many hits evoking the 1980s:

 Yelle: "Nos 18 ans"
 The Cure: "Close to me"
 Telephone: "Ca c'est vraiment toi"
 S'express: "Theme from s'express"
 Simply Red: "If you don't know me by now"
 10cc: "I'm not in love"
 The Buggles: "Video Killed the Radio Star"
 Marino Marini: "Come Prima"
 Metiswing: "De cuba trango este son"
 Dexys Midnight Runners: "Come on Eileen"
 Mano Negra: "Mala Vida"
 Wham: "Wake Me Up Before You Go-Go"
 David Bowie: "Modern love"
 Rickie Lee Jones: "On Saturday Afternoon in 1963"
 The Beautiful South: "Song for whoever"
 The Jam: "Town called Malice"
 Les Rita Mitsouko: "Andy"

Cast
 Théo Frilet as Lucas
 Valentine Catzéflis as Clémence
 Michel Blanc as the teacher Martineau
 Arthur Dupont as Maxime
 Julia Piaton as Sarah
 Liza Manili as Alice
 Pierre Boulanger as Richard
 Bernadette Lafont as Adèle
 Venantino Venantini as Marcello
 Maruschka Detmers as Clémence's mother
 Iris Besse as Valentine
 Annabel Rohmer as Clarisse
 Bartholomew Bouteillis as Yvan
 Pierre Niney as Loïc
 Lucy Ferry as Laura
 Aurélie Cabrero as Princess Leia
 Sylvain Levitte as Edgar Le Prince
 Sébastien Houbani as "Michael Jackson"
 Eric Naggar as the principal
 Xavier Gallais as the gynaecologist
 Roger Contebardo as Werner
 Alain Pointier

See also
 List of French films of 2008

References

External links
 
Official Press Kit 

2008 films
2000s teen comedy films
Remakes of Italian films
French teen comedy films
2008 comedy films
2000s French films
2000s French-language films